was a  of the Imperial Japanese Navy.

Design and description
The Kagerō class was an enlarged and improved version of the preceding . Their crew numbered 240 officers and enlisted men. The ships had two Kampon geared steam turbines, each driving one propeller shaft, using steam provided by three Kampon water-tube boilers.

The main armament of the Kagerō class consisted of six Type 3  guns in three twin-gun turrets, one superfiring pair aft and one turret forward of the superstructure. They were built with four Type 96  anti-aircraft guns in two twin-gun mounts, but more of these guns were added over the course of the war. The ships were also armed with eight  torpedo tubes for the oxygen-fueled Type 93 "Long Lance" torpedo in two quadruple traversing mounts; one reload was carried for each tube. Their anti-submarine weapons comprised 16 depth charges.

Construction and career
The destroyer was ordered in 1937. Nowaki was laid down on 8 November 1939 and launched on 17 September 1940. The ship was commissioned into the IJN on 28 April 1941.

Nowaki was initially assigned to Destroyer Division 4 of the Destroyer Squadron 4. At the beginning of World War II, she was engaged as an escort during the invasion of the Philippine Islands and during subsequent operations around Malaya. On 1 March, Nowaki assisted Arashi in sinking the Dutch motorship Toranja and the British minesweeper Scott Harley, and later that day captured the Dutch steamship Bintoehan. On 2 March, Nowaki assisted in sinking the destroyer . On 3 March 1942, Nowaki helped sink the gunboat . On 4 March, Nowaki assisted in sinking the Australian sloop  and the British Motor Minesweeper 51, tanker Francol, and depot ship Anking.

During the Battle of Midway, Nowaki took survivors off the damaged aircraft carrier  and then helped scuttle her with torpedoes. Later that year Nowaki and the remaining destroyers of Destroyer Division 4 were reassigned to Destroyer Squadron 10 based in Truk. For the remainder of 1942 and most of 1943, Nowaki operated in and around the Solomon Islands.

Returning to the Central Pacific after repairs in Japan, Nowaki took part in the Battle of the Philippine Sea. In the Battle off Samar on 25 October 1944, Nowaki took part in the torpedo attack on the U.S. escort carriers and assisted in sinking the destroyer . Later, she removed survivors from the cruiser  and scuttled her with torpedoes, although recent studies suggests that she only managed to arrive in time to rescue the survivors, as Chikuma herself had sunk beforehand. There were no survivors.

See also
 List of ships of the Japanese Navy

Notes

References

External links
 CombinedFleet.com: Kagero-class destroyers
 CombinedFleet.com: Nowaki history

Kagerō-class destroyers
World War II destroyers of Japan
Shipwrecks in the Philippine Sea
1940 ships
Warships lost in combat with all hands
Maritime incidents in October 1944
Ships built by Maizuru Naval Arsenal